Keiller is either a surname or a given name.

Notable people with the surname include:

Alexander Keiller (disambiguation)
John Keiller MacKay, PC, DSO, VD, QC (1888–1970), the 19th Lieutenant Governor of Ontario from 1957 to 1963
Patrick Keiller (born 1950), British filmmaker, writer and lecturer
Russell Keiller, Scottish curler and coach, European champion

Notable people with the given name include:

Keiller da Silva Nunes (born 1996), Brazilian footballer

See also
 Keillor (surname), surname
 Keeler (disambiguation), place or surname
 Garrison Keillor, of A Prairie Home Companion